Mödling is the capital of the Austrian district of the same name located approximately 14 km south of Vienna.

Mödling lies in Lower Austria's industrial zone (Industrieviertel). The Mödlingbach, a brook which rises in the Vienna Woods, flows through the town. Near Achau it joins with the Schwechat. Woodland occupies a large part of the municipality, part of the Föhrenberge ('Pine Mountains').

Located immediately south of Vienna, and within the boundaries of the district of Mödling, is one of the largest shopping centres in Europe:  Shopping City Süd (SCS).

Geography

Grapes are grown on the slopes of the Wienerwald; the area is called Thermenregion, where one can find much Heurigen (the most recent year's wine).

Wiener Neudorf to the east, and Maria Enzersdorf to the north, merge directly into Mödling. South of Mödling is Gumpoldskirchen, separated by the Eichkogel with its very special flora. In the west a narrow street runs through Vorderbrühl, formally a village in its own rights, and leads to Hinterbrühl.  This narrow valley is called Klausen, above it the remains of the Mödling castle, once belonging to the Babenberger, the then ruling family. On the other side of the Klausen is the Kalenderberg, with the castle of Liechtenstein on its far side. The beginning of the Klausen is marked by the large red-brick aqueduct of the Erste Wiener Hochquellenwasserleitung. The steep, rocky valley sides of the Naturpark Föhrenberge grow the typical Wienerwald-Schwarzföhren (the austriaca form of the European Black Pine, Pinus nigra).

History

The settlement dates back to the Neolithic era. Through the centuries, the name of the town evolved from Medilihha to Medelikch, Medling and, finally, Mödling. These names traces back to old Slavic meaning 'slowly running water'. Today there is a quaint old town with a pedestrian area. The town was the residence of a branch of the Babenberg family, as a result of which it received the nickname Babenbergerstadt ('Town of the Babenbergs').

Traces of the first settlements of the Hallstatt culture from the Neolithic era were found on the Kalenderberg. Roman coins and a Roman burial site have been found near today's railway station.

After Charlemagne's victory in 803 AD against the Avars, the area around Mödling was settled by settlers from Bavaria. About 500 Avar graves were found in the area of the "Goldene Stiege" (very close to today's old city).

The first ancient document mentioning "MEDILIHHA ULTRA MONTEM COMMIGENIUM" is dated 8 September 903, when two bishops (of the then Roman Catholic church) exchanged lands. However, in 907 the settlement seems to have been destroyed again. After the Battle of Lechfeld settlement in the area of today's Mödling started again.

After this, for some time Mödling housed a relative of the then ruling House of Babenberg. In 1177, Henry the Elder, son of Henry II Jasomirgott, became landlord in an area reaching from Liesing to Piesting and Bruck an der Leitha. You can read this in old documents kept in the nearby monastery of Heiligenkreuz. In Henry's days arts and culture dominated in the castle of Mödling; the famous minnesinger Walther von der Vogelweide stayed there more than once. The Spitalkirche and today's St. Othmar were built in the 15th century, the Karner (charnel house) in the 12th.

Even in these times, Mödling grew grapes; after Langenlois, it was the largest grape-growing community in Lower Austria.

In 1343, Duke Albrecht II granted the rights of a market town to Mödling.

In 1529, the Ottomans devastated Mödling for the first time during their first siege of Vienna. In 1679, many citizens died of the Black Death. When the Ottomans came again in 1683, almost all the citizens of Mödling were killed. The second epidemic of the Black Death only brought death to 22 inhabitants, hence the survivors built the monument of the Holy Trinity (Dreifaltigkeits- or Pestsäule) at the Freiheitsplatz.

In the early 19th century, Ludwig van Beethoven often visited his favorite pub, the Three Ravens, in Mödling.

Arnold Schönberg lived in Mödling between 1918 and 1925, and invented his twelve-tone technique of composition there.

On 18 November 1875, Mödling was designated a city.

From 1883 to 1932, Mödling was the starting point of the Mödling and Hinterbrühl Tram, Austria's first electric railway and world's first long-lasting tram with overhead lines.
In 1938, after the Anschluss with Nazi Germany, Mödling was incorporated into the newly formed 24th District of Vienna. In 1954, it became once again a part of Lower Austria.

Population

Politics

1 2020 as NEOS, formerly LIF
2 Wir für Mödling – Eva Maier
3 Bürgerliste Michael Kanyka
4 Wir für Mödling, formerly Liste Pepi Wagner
5 Mödling 2000
6 The size of regional council is 41.
7 The size of city government could vary between 9 and 14.

Traffic

Mödling functions as a traffic hub for its direct vicinity. Bus lines connect the town and Südbahn with the surrounding areas. The Südbahn connects Mödling to Vienna, but also to other local centers like Wiener Neustadt by commuter trains.

Many bus lines end/start at Mödling's railway station: Most of them lead to Vienna (with different ways) (207, 259, 260, 265, 266, 269, 270...) but also other villages in the district are destinations: Gießhübel (262), Hinterbrühl, Gaaden... (364, 365), Guntramsdorf (363) and many more.

The closest airport is Vienna International Airport.

The town lies close to several major motorways (A2, A23, S1).

Until the 1960s, the town was connected to the tram system of Vienna though the line 360 was discontinued after the commuter train system was introduced on the Südbahn. Historically Mödling was the site of the first electrified tram line, which had mainly touristic use.

Economy
In the old days, because of the rail-connection to the north/Vienna and to the south, several large industries had their plants here. Today most of the firms are SMEs. The larger ones have moved to Wiener Neudorf into the 'Industriezentrum Niederösterreich Süd'.

Castles
The Mödling area in the Vienna Forest contains many old castles and ruins. Castle Liechtenstein is the most famous and biggest castle.  It was owned by the wealthy family who later founded the country of the same name. Burgruine Mödling also stands nearby and is one of the oldest ruins in the area.  It dates back to the 11th century.  In addition, Black Tower (Schwarzer Turm) looks out over downtown Mödling from the Calendar mountains.  It was built over 200 years ago, but is still privately occupied to this day.  Lastly, on the walk between Black Tower and Castle Liechtenstein, one will come across a 200-year-old amphitheatre nearly buried in the woods.  It was built in the same time frame as the Black Tower and served as an important cultural centre for the local Mödling population.

Culture and sights

The well-preserved and revitalized Old City is protected by the Hague Convention. The town hall holds the registry office. Because of its lovely environment many couples choose to marry here. Schrannenplatz and Kaiserin-Elisabeth-Strasse were pedestrianised at the very early date of 1976, the first time a 'Bundesstraße' had been declared a pedestrian area.

Nearby is the Eichkogel Nature Reserve, with rare flora, like 'Knollen-Brandkraut' (Phlomoides tuberosa) and others, on 'Halbtrockenrasen'. Among the rocks in the Klausen rare plants grow, like the 'Mödlinger Federnelke' (Dianthus plumarius subsp. neilreichii), which was discovered as late as the middle of the 19th century by the botanist August Neilreich, or the 'Deutsche Alant' (Inula germanica).

Buildings
 St. Othmar church and charnel
 Spitalkirche
 Ruins of the Mödling castle
 Husarentempel on the top of the 'Kleine Anninger'
 Schwarzer Turm
 Amphitheater

Museums
 Museum Mödling
 Volkskundemuseum
 Stadtverkehrsmuseum
 Essinger-Haus (where a famous painter used to live)
 Beethoven-Gedenkstätte
 Schönberg-Haus

Theatres
 Stadttheater
 Bühne Mayer
 Mödlinger Puppenkiste (MÖP)
 Theater im Bunker (in a former air-raid shelter in Vorderbrühl)
 Komödienspiele (summer plays in the Stadttheater)

Schools
 Elementary and secondary schools
 Bundesgymnasium und Bundesrealgymnasium Franz-Keim-Gasse
 Bundesgymnasium und wirtschaftskundliches Bundesrealgymnasium Untere Bachgasse
 Höhere Technische Bundeslehr- und Versuchsanstalt
 Vienna Business School Mödling, Handelsakademie der Wiener Kaufmannschaft
 Höhere Lehranstalt für Mode & Bekleidungstechnik oder Produktmanagement & Präsentation
 Beethoven Musikschule
 Chorschule der Sängerknaben vom Wienerwald
 Volkshochschule
 Polytechnische Schule

Institutions
 Bezirkshauptmannschaft
 Finanzamt
 Bezirksgericht
 Veteranärmedizinisches Institut, which has importance beyond the area of Mödling

Notable citizens

 Ludwig van Beethoven, (1770-1827), composer, lived here in his later years
 Albert Drach, (1902-1995), writer and lawyer
 Martin Gusinde, (1886-1969), priest and ethnologist
 Paul Harather, (born 1965), director, producer, author
 Manfred Hemm, (born 1961), opera singer
 Alfred Maleta, politician, president of the Austrian Parliament ('House of Commons')
 (Blessed) Maria Restituta, (1894-1943), nun and nurse
 Jan Romer, (1869-1934), Polish general, studied here
 Robert Lamezan de Salins (1869-1930), Polish military officer and diplomat
 Josef Schöffel, mayor, 'Retter des Wienerwaldes'
 Arnold Schönberg, (1874-1951), painter and composer, lived here
 Anton Wildgans, poet
 Anton Webern, (1883-1945), composer and conductor, had a studio in Mödling
 Martin Bauer, Austrian motorcycle racer, 3-Time IDM Superbike Champion, also he raced in MotoGP and the Superbike World Championship.
 Maria Janitschek (1859-1927), writer
 Robert Müller (1877-1942), film manager, distributor of films and producer
 Egon Neumann (1894–1948), composer
 Otto Brunner (1898-1982), historian
 Peter Weiser (1926-2012), journalist and secretary general of the Vienna Konzerthaus
 Franz Koglmann (born 1947), jazz musician
 Herbert Kaufmann (born 1949), politician (SPÖ) and member of the Management Board of Flughafen Wien AG
 Bruno Liberda (born 1953), composer
 Dieter Chmelar (born 1957), journalist, presenter and comedian
 Michael Spindelegger (born 1959), politician (ÖVP)
 Gery Keszler (born 1963), founder and organizer of the Life Ball s
 Manfred Zsak (born 1964), football legend
 Ernst Aigner (born 1966), football player
 Rupert Huber (born 1967), composer and pianist
 Michael Buchleitner (born 1969), obstacles and long distance runner
 Karin Gayer (born 1969), writer
 Stephan Marasek (born 1970), football legend
 Marion Maruska (born 1972), tennis player
 Thomas Aigner (born 1973), historian
 Markus Scharrer (born 1974), football player
 Christine Reiler (born 1982), Miss Austria 2007
 Lisa Makas (born 1992), football player

International relations

Twin towns — Sister cities
Mödling is twinned with 

  Esch-sur-Alzette, Luxembourg
  Velletri, Italy
  Zemun, Serbia
  Offenbach am Main, Germany
  Puteaux, France
  Köszeg, Hungary
  Vsetín, Czech Republic
  Saint-Gilles, Belgium
  Zottegem, Belgium
  Dabas, Hungary
Planned partner city relations:
  Gyál, Hungary

References

External links

 Official site of Mödling
 Online map of Mödling
 Online Scouts of Mödling
 Mödling attractions
 History
 Statistics
 Museum Mödling
 Mödling and surrounding in old picture postcards
 detto

 
Cities and towns in Mödling District